August Johannes Kop (May 5, 1904 in Purmerend – April 30, 1945 in Pekanbaru, Sumatra, Dutch East Indies) was a Dutch field hockey player who competed in the 1928 Summer Olympics. He was a member of the Dutch field hockey team, which won the silver medal. He played all four matches as forward.

He died in the Japanese concentration camp at Pakan Baroe building the Sumatra Railway.

References

External links
 
profile

1904 births
1945 deaths
Dutch male field hockey players
Olympic field hockey players of the Netherlands
Field hockey players at the 1928 Summer Olympics
Olympic silver medalists for the Netherlands
Male murder victims
People from Purmerend
Dutch people who died in prison custody
Prisoners who died in Japanese detention
Olympic medalists in field hockey
Medalists at the 1928 Summer Olympics
Dutch military personnel killed in World War II
Dutch prisoners of war in World War II
World War II prisoners of war held by Japan
Sportspeople from North Holland
20th-century Dutch people